The Great Nine Partners Patent, also known as the "Lower Nine Partners Patent," was a land grant in Dutchess County, New York, made on May 27, 1697, by New York governor Benjamin Fletcher.

It was the ninth of fourteen patents granted between 1685 and 1706 which came to cover the entirety of historic Dutchess County (which until 1812 included today's Putnam County).  The first ten, granted between 1685–1697, covered almost all of Hudson River shoreline in the original county, with three - Rombouts, the Great Nine Partners, and Philipse Patents, extending significantly inland. The eleventh, and smallest, Cuyler, 1697, was the first to contain solely inland territory, just in from the Hudson. The twelfth, and next smallest, Fauconnier, in 1703, completed the Hudson River shoreline.  The last two, Beekman, 1705, and the Little Nine Partners, 1706, laid claim to the remaining interior lands.

History
By 1741, all of the remaining land had been divided. The Nine Partners company began a written record of their activities in 1730, when the land began to be surveyed, and a book containing minutes for approximately 150 meetings from 1730 through 1749 is held by the Dutchess County Historical Society. Some documentation regarding the Little (Second) Nine Partners Tract is available at the Moravian Archives in Bethlehem, Pennsylvania.

Prior to 1734, there had been little settlement in the area, but it proceeded rapidly thereafter. Settlers came to the area up the Hudson, but also from New England. When the legislature divided Dutchess County into precincts in 1737, the Nine Partners Grant was included in the Crum Elbow Precinct. In 1762, the Crum Elbow Precinct was divided into two new precincts, called the Amenia and Charlotte Precincts.  In 1786, Charlotte was divided into Clinton and Washington Precincts. Washington Precinct included the towns presently known as Stanford and Washington. Clinton Precinct included present-day Clinton, Hyde Park and Pleasant Valley.  In 1788, the precincts were changed into towns, and in 1793 the town of Stanford was separated from the town of Washington. The town of Clinton was divided into Clinton, Hyde Park and Pleasant Valley in 1821.

The Nine Partners
 Col. Caleb Heathcote
 Maj. Augustine Graham (son of Speaker James Graham)
 James Emott (or Emmot)
 Lt. Col. Henry Filkins
 David Jamison
 Hendrick Ten Eyck
 John Evertson (also shown as Jan Aarston)
 William Creed
 Jarvis Marshall

Current towns derived from the patent
Clinton
Pleasant Valley
Stanford
Washington
Amenia
Hyde Park (part)
North East (part)

See also

 Little Nine Partners Patent
 Dutchess County land patents
 Timeline of town creation in the Hudson Valley

References

External links
 Great Nine Partner Patent (of 2003 regarding Clinton, links only ALHN still relevant)

Dutchess County, New York
Amenia, New York
Hyde Park, New York